Eucamptognathus extremus is a species of ground beetle in the subfamily Pterostichinae. It was described by Jeannel in 1955.

References

Eucamptognathus
Beetles described in 1955